Bolivar TV is a Venezuelan community television channel.  It was created in July 2004 and can be seen in the community of Aroa in the Bolivar Municipality of the Yaracuy State of Venezuela on UHF channel 67.  Kamal Mahmud Hazan is the legal representative of the foundation that owns this channel.

Bolivar TV does not have a website.

See also
List of Venezuelan television channels

Television networks in Venezuela
Television stations in Venezuela